"Comin' Around" is a song co-written and recorded by American country music singer Josh Thompson. It was released in December 2011 as his fourth single release, his only release for RCA Nashville, and it would have been the first single from his unreleased album Change.

Content
"Comin' Around" is about the male narrator, who has made efforts to improve his life. He says that he has realized his past mistakes, and is "comin' around" to change them. According to co-writer Rodney Clawson, the idea came about when Kendell Marvel offered the title "Comin' Around", and they began discussing a song about "how I didn’t understand all this stuff and I didn’t like all this stuff, but now I’m starting to get it".

Critical reception
Giving it 4 stars out of 5, Bobby Peacock of Roughstock said that "the lyrics are some of his best" and that the story line was believable. It received an identical rating from Billy Dukes at Taste of Country, who said that the song showed "honesty without being too preachy".

Music video
P. R. Brown directed the music video, which was filmed in Nashville, Tennessee in January 2012.

Chart performance

Year-end charts

References

2011 singles
2011 songs
Josh Thompson (singer) songs
Songs written by Rodney Clawson
Songs written by Kendell Marvel
Songs written by Josh Thompson (singer)
RCA Records singles